Georgios  Kostikos (born 20 October 1997) is a Greek professional footballer who plays as a midfielder.

Personal
He is the son Giorgos Kostikos.

References

1997 births
Living people
Greek footballers
Super League Greece 2 players
Football League (Greece) players
Gamma Ethniki players
Panthrakikos F.C. players
Pierikos F.C. players
Platanias F.C. players
Association football midfielders
Footballers from Thessaloniki